Dennis Waterman (24 February 1948 – 8 May 2022) was an English actor and singer. He was best known for his tough-guy leading roles in television series including The Sweeney, Minder and New Tricks, singing the theme tunes of the latter two.

Waterman's acting career spanned 60 years, starting with his childhood roles in film and theatre, and adult roles in film, television and West End theatre. He was known for the range of roles he played, including drama (Up the Junction),  horror (Scars of Dracula), adventure (Colditz), comedy (Fair Exchange), comedy-drama (Minder), musical (Windy City) and sport (The World Cup: A Captain's Tale). He appeared in 29 films, the last being released in 2020.

Early life and education
Waterman was born on 24 February 1948, as the youngest of nine children to Rose Juliana (née Saunders) and Harry Frank Waterman in Clapham, south west London.. The family, which included siblings Ken, Peter, a welterweight boxing champion, Stella, Norma, and Myrna, lived at 2 Elms Road, Clapham Common South Side. Harry Waterman was a ticket collector for British Railways. Two older sisters, Joy and Vera, had already left home by the time Dennis was born, and another brother, Allen, had died as a young child.

Boxing was a big part of Waterman's childhood. His father had been an amateur boxer and made all of his sons box. His older brother Ken first took Dennis boxing when he was three years old, and when he was ten Dennis joined Caius Boxing Club.

Waterman was educated at the Granard Primary School, a state primary school on the Ashburton Estate in Putney, southwest London, followed by Corona Stage School, an independent school at Ravenscourt Park in Hammersmith, West London.

Life and career

1960s
Waterman's acting career began in childhood. His first role was in Night Train for Inverness (1960). He appeared in two small stage roles for the Royal Shakespeare Company's 1960 season. In 1961, at the age of 13, he played the part of Winthrop Paroo in the Adelphi Theatre production of The Music Man. A year later, he starred as William Brown in the BBC TV series William based on the Just William books of Richmal Crompton.
Waterman played the role of Oliver Twist in the production of the Lionel Bart musical Oliver! staged at the Mermaid Theatre, London, in the early 1960s, and appeared on the cast recording released in 1961. Waterman was a series regular in the 1962 CBS comedy Fair Exchange, playing teenager Neville Finch. In 1963, he took a "starring" role in the Children's Film Foundation film Go Kart Go.

He later appeared in the premier of Carving a Statue, produced by Peter Wood on 17 September 1964 at the Haymarket Theatre, London. The cast consisted of; Ralph Richardson as The Father, Dennis Waterman as His Son, Barbara Ferris as The First Girl, Jane Birkin as The Second Girl and Roland Culver as Dr Parker.

Waterman was in the original cast of Saved, the play written by Edward Bond, and first produced at the Royal Court Theatre in November 1965. He had a major role in the feature film version of Up the Junction (1968) in which he played Peter, boyfriend to Polly (Suzy Kendall).

1970s
In the early 1970s, Waterman appeared in the BBC television series Colditz as a young Gestapo officer. He played the brother of a victim of Count Dracula (Christopher Lee) in the Hammer film Scars of Dracula (1970), and the boyfriend of Susan George in Fright (1971). He appeared alongside Richard Harris and John Huston in a Hollywood western, Man in the Wilderness (1971). He was a member of the company of actors who featured in The Sextet (1972), a BBC 2 series which included the Dennis Potter drama Follow the Yellow Brick Road, and Waterman later appeared in the same dramatist's Joe's Ark (Play for Today, 1974). Also in 1974, Waterman appeared in episode 4 of the second series of the comedy programme Man About the House entitled "Did You Ever Meet Rommel", in which he played a friend of Robin, a German student by the name of Franz Wasserman. Waterman guest starred in a 1974 Special Branch episode entitled "Stand and Deliver"

He became a household name as DS George Carter in The Sweeney during the 1970s. As well as starring as Terry McCann in Minder, Waterman sang the theme song, "I Could Be So Good for You", which was a top three UK hit in 1980 and a top ten hit in Australia. It was written by his then-wife Patricia along with Gerard Kenny. Waterman also recorded a song with George Cole: "What Are We Gonna Get For 'Er Indoors?"

In 1976, Waterman released his first album, Downwind of Angels, arranged and produced by Brian Bennett. A single, "I Will Glide", was released from the album.

In 1978, Waterman returned to the RSC to play Sackett in Bronson Howard's comedy Saratoga.

1980s
Waterman starred in a television film made by Tyne Tees Television entitled The World Cup: A Captain's Tale (1982). It was the true story of West Auckland Town F.C., a part-time side who won the Sir Thomas Lipton Trophy, sometimes described as the 'First World Cup', in 1909 and 1911. Waterman played the part of Bob Jones, the club captain. It cost £1.5 million to make, most of which was funded by Waterman. Shooting took place in the North East and in Turin in Italy. Scenes were shot in County Durham pit villages and in Ashington, Northumberland, where goalposts and a grandstand were erected in a public park with a colliery headframe in the background.

In 1982, Waterman starred in the musical Windy City. A relatively short-lived production. The cast included Amanda Redman, with whom Waterman had an eighteen-month affair during the run of the musical and with whom he later went on to star in the TV series New Tricks. Windy City closed after 250 performances. Waterman took the lead male role in the BAFTA Award-winning BBC adaptation of Fay Weldon's The Life and Loves of a She-Devil (1986).

In an Australian television film, The First Kangaroos (1988), Waterman's depiction of the rugby player Albert Goldthorpe drew formal complaints from Goldthorpe's granddaughter.

In 1988, Waterman voiced Vernon's sidekick Toaster in the children's animated series Tube Mice, which also starred George Cole.

1990s
After leaving Minder, Waterman appeared as Thomas Gynn in the comedy drama Stay Lucky (1989–93), with Jan Francis and Emma Wray; self made millionaire Tony Carpenter in the sitcom On the Up (1990–92) and John Neil in the mini series Circles of Deceit (1995–96). Between 1997 to 1999, he appeared in series 3 and 4 of the crime drama The Knock.

2000s
He was a regular cast member in every season of New Tricks, from 2003 to 2014, and also sang the theme song. Waterman appeared on stage in Jeffrey Bernard is Unwell by Keith Waterhouse and as Alfred P. Doolittle in the 2001 London revival of My Fair Lady. He narrated the reality-format television programme Bad Lads' Army and appeared in the 2009 BBC2 miniseries Moses Jones.

2020s
In 2020, Waterman starred in the Australian drama-comedy film Never Too Late which had been filmed in Adelaide, Australia, the previous year.
The Minder Podcast revealed that Waterman was semi-retired and living in Spain. The podcast referred to Waterman as "a truly underrated actor" and following Waterman's death pledged to go off air for seven weeks, one for each series of Minder he had appeared in, in commemoration.
An audio tribute episode was released after seven weeks.

Personal life

Marriages 
Waterman was married four times:
Penny Dixon (1967–1976)
Patricia Maynard (1977–1987), an actress with whom he had two daughters, one of whom, Hannah Waterman, is also an actress. Hannah is best known for playing Laura Beale in the BBC1 soap opera EastEnders, and later appeared in New Tricks alongside Waterman as his character's daughter.
Rula Lenska (1987–1998)
Pam Flint (November 2011 – 2022)

Waterman's marriage to Lenska ended because of his violent behaviour towards her. In March 2012, he caused controversy with some comments on this issue: "It's not difficult for a woman to make a man hit her. She certainly wasn't a beaten wife, she was hit and that's different." The interview was broadcast in full on Piers Morgan's Life Stories on ITV in May 2012.

Waterman emigrated to Spain with his wife Pam in 2015 after New Tricks ended, living at a villa in La Manga, and playing golf at the La Manga Club.

Drink-driving convictions 
Waterman was banned from driving for three years in January 1991, following his second drink-driving conviction in four years.

Chelsea F.C. fandom 
Waterman was a fan of Chelsea F.C. His love of football was reflected in his being chosen to present Match of the Seventies from 1995 to 1996, a nostalgic BBC show celebrating the best football matches from the 1970s.

Friendship with George Cole 
In 2015, his friend of many years, George Cole, who had played Arthur Daley in  Minder, died aged 90. Waterman delivered the eulogy at Cole's funeral on 12 August.

Death 
Waterman died from lung cancer at his home in La Manga, Spain on 8 May 2022 at the age of 74.

In popular culture

Little Britain caricature 
Waterman was caricatured by David Walliams in the radio and TV comedy series Little Britain, in sketches where he visits his agent (played by Matt Lucas) looking for parts. Most of the jokes in these sketches feature Waterman being extremely small, with common objects being made to appear massive in comparison. The Waterman caricature is offered, but always declines, respectable parts because he is not allowed to "write the theme tune, sing the theme tune" (rendered as "write da feem toon, sing da feem toon") of the particular production.

This running joke is based on Waterman having sung the theme tunes for at least four of the programmes in which he starred, namely for Minder, Stay Lucky, On the Up and New Tricks. In November 2006, Waterman made a guest appearance in Comic Relief Does Little Britain Live, alongside the comedy character version of himself.

Bibliography 
2000: Waterman, Dennis; and Jill Arlon. – ReMinder. – London: Hutchinson. – .

Filmography

 Night Train for Inverness (1960) – Ted Lewis
 Ali and the Camel (1960) – (voice)
 Snowball (1960) – Mickey Donovan
 Crooks Anonymous (1962) – Boy in Park
 The Pirates of Blood River (1962) – Timothy Blackthorne
 Go Kart Go (1963) – Jimpy
 Up the Junction (1968) – Pete
 Oh! What a Lovely War (1969)
 The Smashing Bird I Used to Know (1969) – Peter
 Wedding Night (1970) – Joe O'Reilly – Groom
 My Lover My Son (1970) – James Anderson
 A Promise of Bed (also known as This, That and the Other) (1970) – Photographer
 Scars of Dracula (1970) – Simon Carlson
 Fright (1971) – Chris
 Man in the Wilderness (1971) – Lowrie
 Alice's Adventures in Wonderland (1972) – 2 of Spades
 The Belstone Fox (1973) – Stephen Durno
 Sweeney! (1977) – Det. Sgt. George Carter
 Sweeney 2 (1978) – Det. Sgt. George Carter
 A Captain's Tale (1982)
 Minder on the Orient Express (1985)
 The Life and Loves of a She-Devil (TV, 1986) – Bobbo
 The First Kangaroos (1988) – Albert Goldthorpe
 Cold Justice (1989) – Father Jim
 Vol-au-vent (1996) – Pete / Kevin
 Arthur's Dyke (2001) – Derek Doubleday
 Back in Business (2007) – Jarvis
 Run for Your Wife (2012, Cameo role)
 Never Too Late (2020) – Jeremiah Caine

Discography

Albums

Singles

References

External links
 
 
  as Dennis Waterman Band
 New Tricks at BBC Drama

1948 births
2022 deaths
Deaths from lung cancer
20th-century English male actors
20th-century English singers
21st-century English male actors
21st-century English singers
British people of English descent
English male film actors
English male Shakespearean actors
English male singers
English male stage actors
English male child actors
English male television actors
English male voice actors
Male actors from London
People from Clapham
Royal Shakespeare Company members
Violence against women in England
DJM Records artists